Muay Lao at the 2009 Southeast Asian Games was held at Beung Kha Ngong Sport Centre from 10 to 15 December 2009 in Vientiane, Laos.

Medal summary

Medalists

Men

Women

External links
 25th SEA Games Official Report

2009 Southeast Asian Games events
2009